Sir Charles Hanbury Williams, KB (8 December 1708 – 2 November 1759) was a Welsh diplomat, writer and satirist. He was a Member of Parliament from 1734 until his death.

Early life
Hanbury was the son of a Welsh ironmaster and Member of Parliament, John Hanbury, and his second wife, Bridget Ayscough, eldest daughter of Sir Edward Ayscough of Stallingborough and South Kelsey. With his father's marriage to Bridget came a fortune of £10,000 and connections with established political families. His mother was a close friend of Sarah Churchill, Duchess of Marlborough.

Charles went to Eton, where he befriended the novelist Henry Fielding.
In 1720, he assumed the name of Williams, under the terms of a bequest from his godfather, Charles Williams of Caerleon.

Career

Williams entered Parliament in 1734, representing the  Monmouthshire constituency as a supporter of Robert Walpole, and held the seat until 1747. In 1754 he was returned to the commons as member for Leominster,  holding the seat until his death.

From 1747 to 1750, Williams served as the British Ambassador in Dresden. In 1748 he had the same function in Poland and witnessed a Polish Sejm, where he met members of the influential Czartoryski family (August Aleksander Czartoryski). When the future King of Poland, Stanisław Poniatowski, was receiving medical treatment in Berlin, Sir Charles met him when sent there as Ambassador (1750–1751). He entered into Polish and Russian history in Saint Petersburg in 1755 by introducing Stanisław Poniatowski to the Russian  Grand Duchess Catherine Alexeyevna (the future Catherine the Great, Empress of Russia), from which a famous romance developed between the Polish aristocrat and the wife of the Russian heir-apparent.

In 1739, Williams gave support for the establishment of the Foundling Hospital and served as one of its founding governors. Williams's father bought the Coldbrook Park estate near Abergavenny for him from his godfather's bequest. There he added a nine-bay, two-storey Georgian façade in 1746.

Seven Years' War

Williams played a major role as a  British envoy (1752-1759) at the court in  Russia during the Seven Years' War of 1756-1763. Although Russia went to war (1756-1762) against Britain's ally  Prussia, Russia and Britain remained at peace.

Poet
Hanbury Williams became known as one of the prominent wits about town, and following in the tradition of Alexander Pope (1688-1744) he wrote a great deal of  satirical light verse, including Isabella, or the Morning (1740), satires on Ruth Darlington and Pulleney (1741–1742), The Country Girl (1742), Lessons for the Day (1742), and Letter to Mr Dodsley (1743). Collections of his poems appeared in 1763 and of his Works in 1822.
Horace Walpole praised the wit of his poetry and wrote of his "biting satire".

Personal life
On 1 July 1732, he married Lady Frances Coningsby (1707/8–1781) at St James, Westminster, London. Lady Frances was a daughter of Thomas Coningsby, 1st Earl Coningsby and Lady Frances Jones (second daughter and sole heiress of Richard Jones, 1st Earl of Ranelagh and the Hon. Frances Willoughby, a daughter and heiress of Francis Willoughby, 5th Baron Willoughby). Together, they had two daughters:
Frances Hanbury-Williams (c. 1735–1759), who married William Capel, 4th Earl of Essex, the son of William Capell, 3rd Earl of Essex and Lady Elizabeth Russell (a daughter of Wriothesley Russell, 2nd Duke of Bedford).
Charlotte Hanbury-Williams (1738–1790), who married Robert Boyle-Walsingham, the fifth and youngest son of Henry Boyle, 1st Earl of Shannon, in 1759. He was lost aboard HMS Thunderer in a West Indian hurricane.

Charles Hanbury Williams died insane in 1759 and the Coldbrook estate passed to his brother George. His widow died on 31 December 1781 and was buried at Westminster Abbey.

Descendants
Through his eldest daughter Frances, he was grandfather to Elizabeth Capel (wife of John Monson, 3rd Baron Monson) and George Capel-Coningsby, 5th Earl of Essex, who married Sarah Bazett, and after her death, Catherine Stephens).

Through his second daughter Charlotte, he was grandfather to Richard Boyle-Walsingham (1762–1788), who died unmarried, and Charlotte Boyle-Walsingham, later suo jure Baroness de Ros, who married Lord Henry FitzGerald, fourth son of James FitzGerald, 1st Duke of Leinster and Lady Emily Lennox, Duchess of Leinster.

Legacy
Williams inspired the character Charles Edaston in the 1913 George Bernard Shaw play Great Catherine, which recounts the story of a British envoy to Catherine's court. It was filmed starring Peter O'Toole in 1968. Williams also left poems said to be "witty but licentious".

Sources

Further reading
David B. Horn, Sir Charles Hanbury Williams and European diplomacy, 1747–58, London et al. 1930: Harrap

External links
Sir Charles Hanbury Williams at the Eighteenth-Century Poetry Archive (ECPA)

1708 births
1759 deaths
British MPs 1734–1741
British MPs 1741–1747
British MPs 1754–1761
Knights Companion of the Order of the Bath
Lord-Lieutenants of Herefordshire
Members of the Parliament of Great Britain for English constituencies
Members of the Parliament of Great Britain for Welsh constituencies
Ambassadors of Great Britain to Russia
Ambassadors of Great Britain to Poland